Darwin Fabián Torres Alonso (born 16 February 1991) is an Uruguayan footballer who plays as a centre back for 9 de Octubre.

Honours

Club

Nacional

Uruguayan Primera División (1): 2011–12

References

External links

1991 births
Living people
People from Lavalleja Department
Association football central defenders
Association football fullbacks
Uruguayan footballers
Uruguayan expatriate footballers
Club Nacional de Football players
Racing Club de Montevideo players
Juventud de Las Piedras players
Cimarrones de Sonora players
Club Atlético Zacatepec players
C.A. Cerro players
Correcaminos UAT footballers
Montevideo Wanderers F.C. players
Uruguayan Primera División players
Ascenso MX players
Uruguayan expatriate sportspeople in Mexico
Expatriate footballers in Mexico
Association football defenders